Syncopy Inc. is a production company founded by British-American film director, screenwriter and producer Christopher Nolan, and producer Emma Thomas. The name of the company is a play on syncopation, and was suggested to Nolan by his late father, Brendan, a classical music fan. Syncopy has offices in Los Angeles, California.

History
Founded in 2001, the majority of Syncopy's productions have been distributed by Warner Bros. They partnered with Legendary Pictures to produce Batman Begins (2005), The Prestige (2006), The Dark Knight (2008), Inception (2010), and The Dark Knight Rises (2012). In 2013, Syncopy released Zack Snyder's Man of Steel, and in 2015, they formed a joint venture with Zeitgeist Films to release Blu-ray editions of Zeitgeist's prestige films. The first title in their partnership was Elena (2011), from director Andrey Zvyagintsev. Recently the production company has produced the science fiction film Interstellar (2014), the documentary short Quay (2015), the war film Dunkirk (2017), and the spy film Tenet (2020), all directed by Christopher Nolan.

Syncopy employs only four people, including Nolan and Thomas. In a 2018 interview for Vanity Fair, Thomas said: "We're not empire builders, we're about the individual film." In October 2021, it was announced that Nolan's next film, titled Oppenheimer, which will be shot in IMAX and 65mm film, will be released on 21 July 2023. The film stars Cillian Murphy in the title role, with Hoyte van Hoytema, Jennifer Lame, and Ludwig Göransson all returning in their respective technical roles. This is Nolan's first film distributed by Universal Pictures, as well as his second film set in the backdrop of World War II after Dunkirk.

Filmography

Feature films

References

Further reading 
 

Christopher Nolan
Film production companies of the United Kingdom
Film production companies of the United States